Mary Lokko was a Ghanaian activist.

Lokko was active in the affairs of the West African Youth League in the 1930s, first becoming involved in discussions surrounding the Second Italo-Ethiopian War, which was then raging. Her beliefs drew attention from local journalists, and in January 1936 I. T. A. Wallace-Johnson suggested that she become his assistant; as a result, she was perhaps the first woman in West Africa to hold an official position in a political organization. She used her platform to support women's involvement in the Youth League. Little is known about her background or her later life.

References

Ghanaian women activists
Year of birth missing
Year of death missing